Martininia is a genus of fungi in the family Sclerotiniaceae.

The genus name of Martininia is in honour of George Willard Martin (1886–1971), who was an American mycologist.

The genus was circumscribed by Kent Parsons Dumont and Richard Paul Korf in Mycologia vol.62 (Issue 3) on page 608 in 1970.

References

External links
Index Fungorum

Sclerotiniaceae